Lake Monticello, a private gated community, is a census-designated place (CDP) in Fluvanna County, Virginia, United States. The population was 9,920 at the 2010 census, an increase of over 44% from 2000. The community is centered on a lake of the same name, which is formed by a dam on a short tributary of the nearby Rivanna River. Lake Monticello is part of the Charlottesville Metropolitan Statistical Area. Lake Monticello was developed in the 1960s as a summer vacation home community but quickly evolved into a bedroom community of Charlottesville, and to a smaller extent of Richmond. It also has a sizable retirement age population.

Geography
Lake Monticello is located in northwestern Fluvanna County at  (37.918286, -78.326803). It is bordered to the northwest by the Albemarle County line, to the northeast by the Rivanna River, to the south by Riverside Drive and South Boston Road, and to the southwest by Virginia State Route 53, the Thomas Jefferson Parkway. VA 53 leads northwest  to Charlottesville, passing Monticello, the estate of Thomas Jefferson, along the way. 
Via the Rivanna River, Lake Monticello is part of the James River watershed.

Demographics

As of the census of 2000, there were 6,852 people, 2,754 households, and 2,194 families residing in the CDP. The population density was 780.9 people per square mile (301.7/km2). There were 2,950 housing units at an average density of 336.2/sq mi (129.9/km2). The racial makeup of the CDP was 94.06% White, 3.50% African American, 0.16% Native American, 0.51% Asian, 0.03% Pacific Islander, 0.28% from other races, and 1.46% from two or more races. Hispanic or Latino of any race were 1.49% of the population.

There were 2,754 households, out of which 32.1% had children under the age of 18 living with them, 70.8% were married couples living together, 6.7% had a female householder with no husband present, and 20.3% were non-families. 15.8% of all households were made up of individuals, and 5.7% had someone living alone who was 65 years of age or older. The average household size was 2.49 and the average family size was 2.77.

In the CDP, the population was spread out, with 23.6% under the age of 18, 3.7% from 18 to 24, 31.0% from 25 to 44, 23.4% from 45 to 64, and 18.3% who were 65 years of age or older. The median age was 39 years. For every 100 females there were 92.6 males. For every 100 females age 18 and over, there were 89.3 males.

The median income for a household in the CDP was $55,556, and the median income for a family was $63,641. Males had a median income of $43,319 versus $30,332 for females. The per capita income for the CDP was $25,226. About 1.2% of families and 1.8% of the population were below the poverty line, including 1.1% of those under age 18 and 1.3% of those age 65 or over.

References

External links
 Lake Monticello Home Owners Association
 
 

Census-designated places in Fluvanna County, Virginia
Monticello
Bodies of water of Fluvanna County, Virginia